"You're in It" is a song written by Justin Adams, Frank Rogers and Mark Nesler, and recorded by American country music singer Granger Smith. It was released in May 2018 as the second single from his ninth studio album When the Good Guys Win. It peaked at No. 36 on the US Country Airplay chart.

Content
In the song, the narrator looks back on good times and realizes that his lady love is always a part of his best moments.

Music video
The music video is directed by Mason Dixon. The music video currently has over 2 million views on YouTube. Co-starring with Smith are fellow country singers Parker McCollum and Koe Wetzel and his wife Amber Smith.

Chart performance

References 

2017 songs
2018 singles
Granger Smith songs
Songs written by Mark Nesler
Songs written by Frank Rogers (record producer)
Song recordings produced by Frank Rogers (record producer)
BBR Music Group singles
Songs written by Justin Adams